Florence Broughton (born 13 May 1962) is a former New Zealand rugby union player. She was a reserve in the Black Ferns first-ever match against the California Grizzlies at Christchurch in 1989 and featured against the Netherlands in RugbyFest 1990.

Her sister is fellow Black Fern Jude Broughton.

References 

1962 births
Living people
New Zealand female rugby union players
New Zealand women's international rugby union players